Kamran Naeem (born 18 May 1987) is a Pakistani first-class cricketer who played for Faisalabad cricket team.

References

External links
 

1987 births
Living people
Pakistani cricketers
Faisalabad cricketers
Cricketers from Faisalabad